Gabriel Lima (born 13 June 1978) is a Brazilian footballer who played as a striker.

Career
Throughout his career, Lima played football for Alki Larnaca and AEP Paphos in Cyprus. He previously played in Qatar on a US$200,000 contract with Al-Ahli. His last known team was Hapoel Ra'anana in the Israeli Liga Leumit division.

His most memorable achievement came during the 2003–04 season with Bnei Sakhnin, where he led the club to a historic State Cup title; his stellar league play throughout the season saw him score seven goals and provide eight assists in thirty league appearances.

References

External links
 CBF 
 Gabriel Lima on YouTube
 

1978 births
Living people
Brazilian footballers
Brazilian expatriate footballers
Fluminense FC players
Associação Desportiva Cabofriense players
Clube Atlético Juventus players
PFC Levski Sofia players
Bnei Sakhnin F.C. players
Bnei Yehuda Tel Aviv F.C. players
Daegu FC players
K League 1 players
Hapoel Ra'anana A.F.C. players
Shanghai Shenxin F.C. players
China League One players
APOP Kinyras FC players
Alki Larnaca FC players
AEP Paphos FC players
Doxa Katokopias FC players
Cypriot First Division players
Expatriate footballers in Bulgaria
Expatriate footballers in Israel
Expatriate footballers in Cyprus
Expatriate footballers in South Korea
Expatriate footballers in China
Expatriate footballers in Qatar
Brazilian expatriate sportspeople in South Korea
Al Ahli SC (Doha) players
People from Cabo Frio
Association football forwards
Qatar Stars League players
Sportspeople from Rio de Janeiro (state)